At least 72 members of the buckwheat order, Polygonales, are found in Montana. Some of these species are exotics (not native to Montana) and some species have been designated as species of concern.

Eriogonum androsaceum, rock-jasmine wild buckwheat
Eriogonum annuum, annual buckwheat
Eriogonum brevicaule var. canum, rabbit buckwheat
Eriogonum caespitosum, mat buckwheat
Eriogonum capistratum var. muhlickii, Muhlick's buckwheat
Eriogonum cernuum, nodding wild buckwheat
Eriogonum effusum, spreading wild buckwheat
Eriogonum flavum, yellow wild buckwheat
Eriogonum flavum var. flavum
Eriogonum flavum var. piperi
Eriogonum heracleoides, parsnip-flower buckwheat
Eriogonum mancum, imperfect wild buckwheat
Eriogonum microthecum, slender buckwheat
Eriogonum ovalifolium, oval-leaved buckwheat
Eriogonum ovalifolium var. depressum, cushion wild buckwheat
Eriogonum ovalifolium var. ochroleucum, oval-leaf buckwheat
Eriogonum ovalifolium var. ovalifolium, oval-leaf buckwheat
Eriogonum ovalifolium var. pansum, oval-leaf buckwheat
Eriogonum ovalifolium var. purpureum, cushion wild buckwheat
Eriogonum pauciflorum, small-flowered buckwheat
Eriogonum pyrolifolium, pyrola-leaved buckwheat
Eriogonum salsuginosum, smooth buckwheat
Eriogonum soliceps, Railroad Canyon wild buckwheat
Eriogonum strictum, Blue Mountain wild buckwheat
Eriogonum umbellatum, sulphur-flowered buckwheat
Eriogonum umbellatum var. aureum, sulphur-flowered buckwheat
Eriogonum umbellatum var. deserticum, sulphur-flower buckwheat
Eriogonum umbellatum var. dichrocephalum, sulphur-flower buckwheat
Eriogonum umbellatum var. ellipticum, starry buckwheat
Eriogonum umbellatum var. majus, sulphur-flower buckwheat
Eriogonum umbellatum var. umbellatum, sulphur-flower buckwheat
Eriogonum visheri, Visher's buckwheat
Koenigia islandica, Iceland koenigia
Oxyria digyna, mountain-sorrel
Polygonum achoreum, leathery knotweed
Polygonum amphibium, water smartweed
Polygonum austiniae, Austin's knotweed
Polygonum aviculare, knotweed
Polygonum bistortoides, American bistort
Polygonum convolvulus, black bindweed
Polygonum douglasii, Douglas knotweed
Polygonum engelmannii, Engelmann's knotweed
Polygonum erectum, erect knotweed
Polygonum hydropiper, marshpepper smartweed
Polygonum lapathifolium, dock-leaf smartweed
Polygonum majus, large knotweed
Polygonum minimum, leafy dwarf knotweed
Polygonum pensylvanicum, Pennsylvania smartweed
Polygonum persicaria, lady's thumb smartweed
Polygonum phytolaccifolium, poke knotweed
Polygonum polygaloides, white-margin knotweed
Polygonum polygaloides subsp. confertiflorum, dense-flower knotweed
Polygonum polygaloides subsp. kelloggii, Kellogg's knotweed
Polygonum punctatum, dotted smartweed
Polygonum ramosissimum, bushy knotweed
Polygonum sachalinense, giant knotweed
Polygonum sawatchense, Johnston's knotweed
Polygonum spergulariiforme, scatter knotweed
Polygonum viviparum, alpine bistort
Reynoutria japonica (syn. Polygonum cuspidatum), Japanese knotweed
Rumex acetosa, garden sorrel
Rumex acetosella, sheep sorrel
Rumex crispus, curly dock
Rumex fueginus, sea-side dock
Rumex hymenosepalus, canaigre dock
Rumex obtusifolius, bitter dock
Rumex occidentalis, western dock
Rumex patientia, patience dock
Rumex paucifolius, alpine sheep sorrel
Rumex salicifolius, willow dock
Rumex stenophyllus, narrowleaf dock
Rumex venosus, veined dock

See also
 List of dicotyledons of Montana

Further reading

References

Montana